Taylor Hill is a mountain located in the Catskill Mountains of New York southeast of Hancock. Jensen Hill is located west-southwest, Rattlesnake Hill is located west-northwest, Big Fork Mountain is located north-northeast, and Johnny Ridge is located northwest of Taylor Hill.

References

Mountains of Delaware County, New York
Mountains of New York (state)